Denis Zvonić (born 8 February 1992) is a Bosnian professional footballer who plays as a defender for Bosnian Premier League club Velež Mostar. He is also the captain of Velež.

Club career

Velež Mostar
Zvonić started off his football career as a youngster at hometown club Velež Mostar's youth team. In July 2011, Zvonić signed with Velež's first team. Between 2011 and 2015, he was a standard player at the club, making 93 Bosnian Premier League appearances for Velež, scoring 5 goals during that period. In June 2015, Zvonić left Velež.

Zvijezda Gradačac
On 2 July 2015, Zvonić joined First League of FBiH club Zvijezda Gradačac. During the 2015–16 season, he was a regular first choice player at Zvijezda and played all 30 league games for the club, scoring 2 goals in the process. On 12 June 2016, he left Zvijezda.

Return to Velež
One year after leaving Velež, Zvonić returned to the club during the summer of 2016. During the club's winter preparations for the continuation of the 2018–19 First League of FBiH season in January 2019, he was named the new club captain after captain until that day, Elmir Kuduzović, gave him the captain armband.

On 24 January 2019, Zvonić extended his contract with Velež, which is due to last until June 2022. On 25 May 2019, he won the First League of FBiH with Velež after the club beat Bosna Visoko 0–2 away and got promoted back to the Bosnian Premier League.

On 28 July 2019, in a 1–0 away Mostar derby league loss against Zrinjski Mostar, Zvonić scored an own goal in the 54th minute of the game and at the end brought the victory to Zrinjski. On 19 October 2019, less than three months after scoring an own goal against Zrinjski, this time Zvonić scored a goal for Velež in the 86th minute against their fierce city rivals, bringing his team the first win in a Mostar derby match after more than 5 years.

In a league game against Sarajevo on 23 August 2020, Zvonić injured himself after breaking his nose.

International career
Zvonić was part of the Bosnia and Herzegovina U21 national team and made one appearance for the team in 2014.

Honours
Velež Mostar
Bosnian Cup: 2021–22
First League of FBiH: 2018–19

References

External links

Denis Zvonić at FootballDatabase

1992 births
Living people
Sportspeople from Mostar
Bosnia and Herzegovina footballers
Premier League of Bosnia and Herzegovina players
First League of the Federation of Bosnia and Herzegovina players
FK Velež Mostar players
NK Zvijezda Gradačac players
Bosnia and Herzegovina under-21 international footballers
Association football central defenders